was a Japanese businessman, central banker and the 6th Governor of the Bank of Japan (BOJ). He was a Baron and a member of Japan's House of Peers from 1900 through 1916.

Early life
Matsuo was born in Hyogo Prefecture.

Career
In 1900, Matsuo had risen to the position of bureau chief in the Finance Ministry.

Matsuo was BOJ Governor from October 20, 1903 to June 1, 1911.  During his term, the bank managed the money supply to restrain inflation.

In 1904, Matsuo assembled the heads of 35 commercial banks, offering favourable terms for lending by BOJ.

Matsuo construed complaints about "bad times" to mean that economic conditions were normal, and that there had been diminished opportunities for speculation.

Notes

References
 Augello, Massimo M. and Marco Enrico Luigi Guidi. (2005). Economists in Parliament in the Liberal Age (1848-1920).	Burlington: Ashgate.; 
 Duus, Peter. (1995). The Abacus and the Sword: The Japanese Penetration of Korea, 1895-1910. Berkeley: University of California Press. 

1843 births
1916 deaths
People from Hyōgo Prefecture
Japanese bankers
Members of the House of Peers (Japan)
Governors of the Bank of Japan